Major Dell Conway of the Flying Tigers was an early American television program broadcast on the now defunct DuMont Television Network. The series ran from April 7, 1951 to March 2, 1952.

Broadcast history
The show was an action-adventure series originally starring B-movie actor Eric Fleming as Major Dell Conway. Fleming was replaced in July 1951 by Ed Peck. Other actors included Fran Lee (as Ma Wong), Luis Van Rooten, David Anderson, Joe Graham, Harry Kingston, and Bern Hoffman as Caribou Jones. According to Brooks and Marsh (2007), the roles some of these actors portrayed has been lost to time.

Episode titles included "Murder in Paris", "Hostage in Havana", "Port Said", "The Sacred Jewel of Calcutta" and "Mission to Korea".

Major Dell Conway was loosely based on a true story about a pilot who flew with the Flying Tigers in World War II China. The series has been called "an extremely low-budget production". The program was produced by J. Gen Genovese, who had served as a pilot during the war. The program aired on Saturday at 6:30 pm EST on most DuMont affiliates. In May 1951, the series went on hiatus, returning to the air on Sunday afternoons from July 1951 to March 1952. The final episode aired on March 2, 1952.

Episode status

UCLA Film & Television Archive holds 20 episodes of this series.

See also
List of programs broadcast by the DuMont Television Network
List of surviving DuMont Television Network broadcasts

References

Bibliography
David Weinstein, The Forgotten Network: DuMont and the Birth of American Television (Philadelphia: Temple University Press, 2004) 
Alex McNeil, Total Television, Fourth edition (New York: Penguin Books, 1980) 
Tim Brooks and Earle Marsh, The Complete Directory to Prime Time Network TV Shows, Third edition (New York: Ballantine Books, 1964)

External links

DuMont historical website

DuMont Television Network original programming
1951 American television series debuts
1952 American television series endings
Aviation television series
Black-and-white American television shows
Flying Tigers in fiction